After its unveiling in 1886, the Statue of Liberty (Liberty Enlightening the World), by Frédéric Auguste Bartholdi, quickly became iconic, and began to be featured on posters, postcards, pictures and books. The statue's likeness has also appeared in films, television programs, music videos, and video games, and has been used in logos, on postage stamps and coins, and in theatrical productions. Liberty Enlightening the World remains a popular local, national, and international political symbol of freedom.

Books and stories

 The 1911 O. Henry story, "The Lady Higher Up", relates a fanciful conversation between "Mrs. Liberty" and the Madison Square Garden Diana statue by Augustus Saint-Gaudens. In the story, Diana asks "Mrs. Liberty" why she speaks with what Diana terms a "City Hall brogue." Liberty answers: "If ye'd studied the history of art in its foreign complications ye'd not need to ask. If ye wasn't so light-headed and giddy ye'd know that I was made by a Dago and presented to the American people on behalf of the French Government for the purpose of welcomin' Irish immigrants into the Dutch city of New York."
 In Amerika by Franz Kafka, the author inaccurately depicts the statue as holding aloft a sword rather than a torch.
 During the 1940s and 1950s, the iconography of science fiction in the United States was filled with images of ancient, decayed Statues of Liberty, set in the distant future. The covers of famous pulp magazines such as Amazing Stories and Astounding Science Fiction all featured Lady Liberty at one time, surrounded by ruins or by the sediments of the ages, as curious aliens or representatives of advanced or degenerate humans of the future gazed upon her remains. The February 1941 cover of Astounding showed a primitive man and woman approaching on a raft a Statue of Liberty surrounded by wild growth.
 In the final scene of Maggie-Now (1958) by Betty Smith, two characters scatter Maggie's late husband's ashes from the statue's torch.
 Jack Finney's 1970 novel Time and Again takes advantage of the presence, in 1882, of just the arm and torch of the statue in Madison Square Park – where they were exhibited to help raise funds for the pedestal – for an important plot development.
 The final chapter of Roald Dahl's James and the Giant Peach (1981) reveals that "The Glow-worm became the light inside the torch on the Statue of Liberty, and thus saved a grateful City from having to pay a huge electricity bill every year."
 Ellen Kushner's 1986 Choose Your Own Adventure book Statue of Liberty Adventure has the protagonist exploring the statue to find its original inspiration.
 In the disaster novels Her Name Will Be Faith and Category 7: The Biggest Storm in History, hurricanes cause storm surges that topple the statue into the Hudson River.
 In the first volume of the Southern Victory series How Few Remain (1997) by Harry Turtledove, the Statue of Liberty does not exist in New York City, as relations between the United States and France are poor. This is due to France supporting the Confederate States in the War of Succession and the Second Mexican War. However, in the novel American Empire: Blood and Iron, Liberty Island (still called Bedloe Island in the series) is taken up by a similar but more grim-looking statue called "The Statue of Remembrance", which is German-influenced rather than French and personifies the United States' revanchist Remembrance ideology against the Confederate States, Britain and France. This statue carries a sword in its right hand and a shield in its left. Its full name is Remembrance, holding aloft her bared sword.
 The climax of Philip Shelby's 1998 thriller Gatekeeper had the assassin 'Handyman' using the Statue's crown as a sniper's perch in his plot to murder the wife of a Presidential candidate.
 Nevada Barr's 1999 mystery novel Liberty Falling is set on Liberty Island and Ellis Island, and features deaths caused by falling from the Statue of Liberty.
 In the 2006 speculative fiction novel Empire by  Orson Scott Card, two United States Air Force F-16 jets are shot down into New York Harbor with one hitting the gown of the statue.
 The history of the Statue of Liberty is told in the 2008 book Lady Liberty: A Biography, written by Doreen Rappaport, illustrated by Matt Tavares.
 Giannina Braschi's dramatic novel United States of Banana (2011) takes place after the September 11, 2001 attacks, at the Statue of Liberty, where a political prisoner from Puerto Rico is trapped in the dungeon of liberty beneath the 11-pointed star that serves as the base of the Statue.
 The 1999 children's book Disasters by Ned Halley has an illustration of a future New York City behind a seawall, to prevent flooding by sea level rise because of global warming. Liberty Island is seen submerged in the ocean up to the top of the statue's pedestal.
 The 1996 children's book Incredible Comparisons by Russell Ash uses the statue throughout the book as a height and weight comparison. It is mentioned on one page that if the sea level rose because all the world's ice melted (possibly due to global warming), that the statue would be submerged in the ocean up to the bottom of her torch. This scenario was later depicted in the 2001 sci-fi movie A.I. Artificial Intelligence.

Coins and currency
 The Statue of Liberty has been depicted on several coins, not only in the US, but all over the world. One of the most recent silver coins is the 20 euro SMS Sankt Georg commemorative coin. The obverse shows the armored cruiser SMS Sankt Georg sailing into New York Harbor on May 17, 1907; passing right in front of the Statue of Liberty. This was to be the last visit of an Austrian naval vessel in the U.S.A.
 The Statue of Liberty was also depicted on the Freedom Tower Silver Dollar coin minted in the Commonwealth of the Northern Mariana Islands.
 From January 2, 2001 to 2008, the Statue of Liberty was on the reverse side of the New York state quarter in the 50 State Quarters series.
 Since 2006, the United States ten-dollar bill has featured two drawings of the Statue's torch on the obverse.

Comics
 In the first issue of Atomic War! published in November 1952, New York City is hit with a Soviet atomic bomb in an alternate 1960, causing the Statue of Liberty to topple onto the RMS Queen Mary, which was passing the statue at the time of the bombing. 
 In a 1970s issue of DC Comics' Wonder Woman, villainous sorcerer Felix Faust turns the Statue of Liberty into a living enemy of the Princess.
 The Statue of Liberty is depicted in the artwork Our Nation's 200th Birthday, The Telephone's 100th Birthday (1976) by Stanley Meltzoff for Bell System.
 In the Teenage Mutant Ninja Turtles Adventures issue "Something Fishy Goes Down", Shredder tries to destroy the Statue of Liberty.
 The DC Comics superhero Miss America was originally granted her powers by the Statue in a vision. This was later retconned to have been a dream; she had really gained her powers from an experiment.
 In the Marvel Comics universe, the torch of the Statue of Liberty is the secret meeting spot between superheroes Spider-Man and his friend and confidant Human Torch.
 The cover of the fourth volume of the comic series Universal War One depicts a shattered shell of the Statue of Liberty to represent the destruction of Earth by the Colonization Industrial Companies.
 In the Sinfest webcomic "Lady Liberty", a humanized version of the Statue, is the spouse of a similarly humanized Uncle Sam. Owing to their iconic status as embodiments of current America, while Uncle Sam is shown as often worried, affected by financial woes and bouts of depression, Lady Liberty is shown as a quiet, nurturing and loving spouse, doing her best to help her husband around, but still prone to overreaction.
 Swedish cartoonist Joakim Lindengren and Puerto Rican author Giannina Braschi created United States of Banana in 2017; in this comic book, Lady Liberty falls in love with a prisoner, Segismundo, who lives in a dungeon beneath her skirt.
 According to his autobiography, Disney Studios illustrator Bill Peet was asked by Walt Disney to draw some storyboards for an animated sequence that was to be included in the 1943 documentary film Victory Through Air Power showing a hypothetical enemy air raid on New York City. The last scenes of the sequence were to show the Statue of Liberty sinking into New York Harbor. Ultimately, the sequence was never animated and used in the film.
In issues 1 - 5 of Fleetway Comic's series based on the MASK cartoon/toy range, in a story entitled "The Great Head Robbery" the terrorist organisation VENOM are seen decapitating then stealing the head of the statue under cover of a massive power cut, later replacing it with a dummy which doubles as a weapons platform. It is later destroyed by MASK and the real head found in a garbage dump and returned to its rightful place.
 In Kingdom Come (1996), the Earth-22 version of the statue is the site of a battle between the Justice League and the Americommando. During the battle, the statue's right arm falls off and is caught by Wonder Woman. In the denoumount, Batman mentions that it's been a while since he saw the Statue of Liberty being rebuilt on the news.

Films

Pre-1960
 The Statue appears in Charlie Chaplin's 1917 comedy film The Immigrant.
 The Statue is seen animated in the 1918 short film The Sinking of the Lusitania, as the RMS Lusitania passes it while leaving New York Harbor at the beginning of its ill-fated final voyage.
 The Statue appears in Frank Capra's 1926 silent comedy film The Strong Man.
 The Statue is hit by a tsunami in the 1933 science-fiction film Deluge.
 The Statue appears as one of the bell-ringing figures of a clock tower in the 1937 Disney cartoon Clock Cleaners.
 The Statue is seen in the 1941 film The Strawberry Blonde.
 The Statue appears at the climax of the 1942 espionage film Saboteur. 
 A miniature of the Statue appears symbolically at the end of the 1943 Disney anti-Nazi propaganda cartoon Der Fuehrer's Face, as Donald Duck wakes up from a nightmare about living in Nazi Germany. When he first sees the shadow of the miniature, he mistakes it for someone doing a Nazi salute.
 At the end of the 1946 Warner Bros. cartoon Baseball Bugs, Bugs Bunny goes to the top of the Empire State Building to catch a long fly ball hit by one of the Gashouse Gorillas. When the umpire calls the batter out, and the batter protests, the Statue of Liberty appears, saying "That's what the man said, you heard what he said, he said that…", with Bugs echoing her words.
 The 1952 film drama Park Row uses the funding of the Statue's pedestal as a subplot.
 In the 1953 comedy Abbott and Costello Go to Mars, their rocketship, on its return trip from Venus, nearly hits the Statue of Liberty, which Lady Liberty quickly kneels down while the runaway rocketship flies just over her and she stands back up.

1960s — 1970s
 The final scene in The Last of the Secret Agents? features an early-evening heist involving the Statue's removal from its pedestal by helicopter and cable.
 The 1968 science-fiction classic Planet of the Apes ends with a shot of the Statue off its foundation, and half buried in the sand of a beach after nuclear war thousands of years prior.
 The Statue appears in the 1974 crime film The Godfather Part II.
 The Statue appears in the 1977 Disney animated film The Rescuers.
 In the 1978 superhero film Superman, Superman takes Lois Lane on a ride flying with him, in which they fly around the Statue.

1980s — 1990s
 The Statue appears in the 1981 science fiction film Escape from New York.
 The Statue appears in Straub-Huillet's 1984 drama film Klassenverhältnisse.
 Madison makes a nude appearance in 1984's Splash at the Statue of Liberty.
 The poster for the 1984 film Supergirl depicts the Statue of Liberty holding the torch in its left hand. The Statue does not appear in the film itself.
 The Statue makes an appearance in the first episode of the 1984 CBS miniseries Ellis Island.
 One of the chase scenes in the 1985 movie Remo Williams: The Adventure Begins was filmed on Liberty Island; a replica of the statue was also created to film some detailed scenes. Takes place during its conservation-restoration, when the statue was surrounded by scaffolding.
 The Statue appears in the 1985 comedy film National Lampoon's European Vacation.
 The 1986 film Liberty is a fictionalized account of the construction of the Statue of Liberty, which had been completed 100 years earlier.
 The Statue appears in the final stages of its construction in the 1986 Don Bluth animated film  An American Tail, and is completed at the end of the film. It also appears in the three sequels.
 The Statue appears in the 1987 superhero film Superman IV: The Quest for Peace.
 The opening scene of the 1988 romantic comedy film Working Girl opens with a helicopter shot of the Statue's face, pans around the Statue, then settles on the Staten Island Ferry, then follows the ferry to end with a view of Lower Manhattan.
 In the 1989 science-fiction film Ghostbusters II, the Statue is brought to life by the Ghostbusters to help save New York City.
 The Statue appears in the 1992 film Home Alone 2: Lost In New York.
 A version of the Statue appears in the 1995 film Batman Forever.
 The Statue appears damaged in the 1995 science-fiction film Judge Dredd.
 The Statue is shown toppled into New York Harbor during an alien invasion in the 1996 science fiction film Independence Day.
 The Statue climbed on the outside by a teenage Amazon hunter in the 1997 comedy film Jungle 2 Jungle.
 The Statue appears in the 1997 epic film Titanic, when the rescue ship  enters New York Harbor
 The Statue, along with many other buildings, is toppled by a megatsunami created by a comet impact in the 1998 science-fiction film Deep Impact.
 The Statue appears in the opening credits of the 1998 drama film The Legend of 1900, as an ocean liner carrying immigrants passes it while entering New York harbor, and all the passengers and crew on board the liner cheer when they see it. The liner is seen moving past the statue from right to left, which in reality, would make the ship leaving New York harbor, not entering it.

2000 — present
 The Statue and Liberty Island are featured prominently in the final climax of the 2000 superhero film X-Men.
 The Statue is briefly seen submerged in the ocean up to her torch in the 2001 science-fiction film A.I. Artificial Intelligence.
 The Statue appears in the ending of the 2002 science-fiction film Men in Black II, with a neuralizer located in the torch being deployed to erase the memories of the entire population of New York City.
 A parody version of the statue is seen in the 2003 animated comedy French film The Triplets of Belleville. She is seen to be obese and is holding a hamburger on top of her tablet and an ice cream cone instead of a torch.
 The Statue is hit by a massive storm surge and frozen in the 2004 science-fiction film The Day After Tomorrow.
 The Statue is destroyed by Rodan in the 2004 kaiju film Godzilla: Final Wars.
 The Statue's parts before construction are featured in the 2004 adventure film Around the World in 80 Days.
 The Statue appears as a bamboo in the 2005 DreamWorks Animation film Madagascar and its sequels.
 The Statue appears in the 2006 Disney animated film The Wild.
 The 2008 monster film Cloverfield features the Statue getting decapitated by a giant monster.
 The Statue and Liberty Island are prominently featured at the beginning and end of the 2008 science-fiction comedy film Meet Dave.
 The Statue appears in the 2011 science-fiction film The Adjustment Bureau.
 The Statue is briefly seen buried up to her torch in a canyon in the 2013 science-fiction film Oblivion.
 The Statue appears prominently in the 2013 drama film The Immigrant.
 The Statue can be briefly seen with its original copper color in a scene set in 1895 in the 2014 romantic fantasy film Winter's Tale.
 The Statue is featured in the 2015 film The Walk. The movie features Joseph Gordon-Levitt playing Phillippe Petit, who narrates the events of the film from the torch. The film is set in the 1970s, so it includes the original torch before restoration.
 The Statue appears in the 2016 animated film Ballerina under construction at Gustave Eiffel's workshop. The film is set in the late 1880s, so the Statue should have been sent over to the United States by this point. The statue is also erroneously given the color of copper carbonate, even though the statue would have still been its original copper color.

 The Statue appears in the virtual reality world called the Oasis in the 2018 science fiction film Ready Player One in the first challenge which is a car race that takes place in an ever-shifting Manhattan cityscape.
 The 2019 documentary, Liberty: Mother of Exiles, chronicles the history of the statue and its creators as well as the 2018 construction of the Statue of Liberty Museum.
 The climax of the 2021 superhero film Spider-Man: No Way Home is set on and around the Statue of Liberty, which is undergoing a redesign: the patina has been removed to restore the original copper look, while a giant copper replica of Captain America's shield is added to the torch-bearing arm. During the battle, the shield is knocked off and falls to the ground, and the torch becomes visible once again.

Logos
 The US Army 77th Sustainment Brigade, originally the 77th Infantry Division, has used a gold Statue of Liberty on a blue background as its shoulder patch, since its activation for World War I from draftees and recruits mostly from the New York City area.
 In March 2011, Nike SB released a two-layer sneaker featuring the Statue of Liberty logo on the tongue. When skated, the sneaker turns the oxidized color (seagreen) back to copper.
 New York and New Jersey have both featured the statue on license plates. The statue was on the regular New York plate from 1986 until 2001. A New Jersey speciality plate celebrating Liberty State Park has been available for many years and is still available .
 The Central Railroad of New Jersey used the national monument as its logo. Its main station, Communipaw Terminal, is located on Upper New York Bay nearby.
 The Japanese entertainment company Amuse has a replica of the Statue of Liberty above the word "Amuse" as its logo.
 The mission flight patch worn by the crew of STS-51-J (the debut launch of the Space Shuttle Atlantis) has the Statue of Liberty embossed on it.
 The statue appears in the logo of the insurance company Liberty Mutual.  A series of television commercials for the company began in 2013 which show the statue in the background, with each commercial being shot from a different angle from places in New York City and New Jersey.

Music videos
 The Statue of Liberty was featured in the 1986 music video for "Walk Like An Egyptian" by The Bangles, walking like an Egyptian.
 Toward the end of Michael Jackson's 1991 video for "Black or White", Jackson can be seen standing at the top of a replica of the statue.

Political symbolism
 The artist Joseph Pennell created a poster for the fourth Liberty Loans campaign of 1918, during World War I, showing the statue headless and torchless, while around her the New York area was in flames, under attack by air and by sea. The poster is sometimes referred to as "That liberty shall not perish", after the first words that appear on it.
 Many libertarian organizations use the statue as their symbol.
 The Conservative Party of New York uses the statue's torch and flame as its symbol.
 The German magazine Der Spiegel, on the cover of their edition of February 4, 2017, showed the statue beheaded by Donald Trump.

Pranks
 In 1978, at the University of Wisconsin–Madison, Jim Mallon and Leon Varjian of the "Pail and Shovel Party" won election by promising to give campus issues "the seriousness they deserve." In 1979 (and again in 1980), they created their own version of the Planet of the Apes scene by erecting replicas of the torch and the top of the head on the frozen surface of Lake Mendota, creating a fanciful suggestion that the entire statue was standing on the bottom of the lake.

Sports
 The New York Rangers of the National Hockey League used the head of the Statue of Liberty as their logo on their third jersey from 1996 to 2007 and again in 2021. Goaltender Mike Richter also featured the head of the statue on his mask throughout his career with the Rangers.
 The New York Liberty of the Women's National Basketball Association use the Statue of Liberty image in their team logo.
 In American football, the "Statue of Liberty play" is a trick play in which the quarterback holds the ball over his head and slightly behind, as if to throw a pass – thus looking somewhat like the Statue – and then does a stealthy handoff to a running back, who plucks the ball out of the quarterback's hand.

Television
 On April 8, 1983, CBS broadcast the fifth in a series featuring illusionist David Copperfield, in which he made the statue 'vanish'. The effect took place at night. The program showed the statue from the point of view of an audience seated on a ground-level platform, viewing the statue between two scaffolding towers in which a large curtain was raised.
 In the series Fringe, Liberty Island is the militarized stronghold of the Department of Defense in an alternate universe, and scenes from several episodes take place on or around the island.  In the alternate universe, the statue has not acquired a green patina due to a special cleaning process and has retained  its original copper color and the original torch which did not have the 1916 stained glass windows cut into the flame by Gutzon Borglum in this universe's timeline. The statue and Liberty Island are first seen in the series in the two-part Season 2 finale "Over There". In the penultimate episode of the series, "Liberty", which takes place in a dystopian future in the prime universe, Liberty Island has been converted into a detention facility, and the statue has been dismantled down to its feet.
 In a 1991 episode of the PBS game show Where in the World Is Carmen Sandiego?, the case begins with Carmen's henchwoman Eartha Brut stealing the Statue's torch with her bare hands.
 In the 1999 Family Guy episode "Death Has a Shadow", the Statue is shown on television at a stag party and all the guys there drink until she "looks hot". In the 2006 episode "I Take Thee Quagmire", Peter gets Quagmire one of the Statue's feet as a wedding present, leading Mayor West to believe that the Statue was blown up.
 In Courage the Cowardly Dog, the statue can be seen in a few episodes.
 In the end credits of every Sesame Street episode from Seasons 24-37, the statue is seen dancing to the theme song.
 In the 1997 Simpsons episode "The City of New York vs. Homer Simpson", the Simpson family visits the statue.
 The statue can be seen numerous times in Futurama. In the opening theme song sequence of every episode, Liberty Island is seen submerged in the ocean up to the top of the pedestal (possibly due to sea level rise because of global warming), and the statue is holding a raygun instead of a torch in her right hand. In the 1999 pilot episode Space Pilot 3000, the statue is holding a transport tube in her right hand instead of a torch. It is also seen normally and is damaged in the episodes "When Aliens Attack" (1999), "That Darn Katz!" (2010), and "The Late Philip J. Fry" (2010).
 The statue appears in one of Stan's framed pictures in the opening sequence of American Dad!
 In the 2001 Gene Roddenberry's Andromeda episode "The Sum of Its Parts", Captain Dylan Hunt quotes the poem on the Statue.
 The Statue of Liberty only appears in a trailer for Hi Hi Puffy AmiYumi on Cartoon Network.
 In the season 1 episode Our Huge Adventure from Little Einsteins, the team must find a way to get the butterfly back to its tree with the other butterflies. They travel to the Statue of Liberty in one part.
 In the 2006 Wonder Pets! Season 1 episode "Save the Pigeon", the group must rescue a baby pigeon who is stuck in the Statue of Liberty's nose.
 In the 2007 CSI: NY Season 4 episode "Can You Hear Me Now?", a murder takes place at the statue.
 In the 2009 South Park episode "Pee", a replica of the statue in a water park is destroyed by a tsunami of urine.
 In My Little Pony: Friendship Is Magic, a statue seen in Applejack's flashback in "The Cutie Mark Chronicles" (2011) and in "Rarity Takes Manehattan" (2014) greatly resembles the Statue of Liberty, but in the form of a mare instead of a woman.
 In the 2012 Doctor Who episode "The Angels Take Manhattan", the statue is depicted as a colossal Weeping Angel.
 In the Disney sitcom Jessie 2013 episode 'Grudgement Day', by 2072 the face of Emma Ross has replaced the Statue's original countenance.
 The Statue appears in the 2013 Mickey Mouse season 1 episode "New York Weenie".
 The statue appears frequently in Schoolhouse Rock!, sometimes seen alive.
 In the 2017 Big Mouth episode “Everybody Bleeds”, the main characters visit Liberty Island on a school field trip, where Jessi gets her period in one of the bathrooms. Later, the statue appears to Jessi in a vision, speaking in an overexaggerated French accent and bemoaning the negative aspects of womanhood Jessi will face in the future.
 In the alternate-history television series The Man in the High Castle, the statue's destruction makes up a significant part of the 2018 season 3 finale "Jahr Null", where it is destroyed by missiles fired by Nazi aircraft as part of a campaign to destroy American icons.
 In the 2021 Rick and Morty season 5 episode "Rick & Morty's Thanksploitation Spectacular", while attempting to steal the U.S. Constitution for a secret treasure map, Morty (in addition to destroying the Constitution, the Liberty Bell, and the Lincoln Memorial) accidentally activates a giant steam-powered robot hidden inside the Statue of Liberty, which Rick describes as a French Trojan Horse.
 In the 2021 What If...? season 1 episode "What If... Thor Were an Only Child?", Surtur (an attendee of Thor's massive party on Earth) flirts with the Statue of Liberty.
 The 2013 Super Sentai series, Zyuden Sentai Kyoryuger features Many-Faced High Priest Chaos as the de jure leader of Deboth Army, who is designed after the Statue of Liberty.

Theme parks
 Epcot's The American Adventure attraction ends with Benjamin Franklin and Mark Twain standing on the Statue's torch, relishing their view of America. The attraction used a replica of the statue from its 1982 opening until its 1986 renovation.
 Disneyland Park in Disneyland Paris contains a section of its Main Street, U.S.A. area called Liberty Arcade. The arcade features an exhibit about the Statue of Liberty, and itself is a tribute to both the statue and France's relationship with the United States. 
 The Statue of Liberty is featured in The Amazing Adventures of Spider-Man attraction located at Islands of Adventure in Orlando, Florida and Universal Studios Japan in Osaka, Japan. In the queue, it is known from "live" TV coverage in the Daily Bugle building that the evil Sinister Syndicate captures the Statue of Liberty with an anti-gravity gun and use it as a leverage against New York City. In the ride, parts of the Statue of Liberty are torn off and at the end, the statue is recovered by authorities with its parts fully restored and taken back to its rightful place while Spider-Man ties up the Syndicates in a web-like cocoon.

Toys

 The Lego Group has released a Lego minifigure based on the Statue of Liberty for Series 6 of the Lego Minifigures theme in 2012.

Typography
 The statue has its own Unicode character: 🗽

Video games
 The Statue is seen in New York harbor by players who travel to New York in the 1985 computer game Where in the World Is Carmen Sandiego?.
 In 1989's Ghostbusters II, an action video game based on the film of the same name, the Statue is brought to life by the Ghostbusters to help save New York City.
 In 1992's Teenage Mutant Ninja Turtles: Turtles in Time, the statue is stolen by Krang, setting the game's story into motion.
 In the 2000 video game Deus Ex, the statue appears heavily damaged, missing its head and torch. It can be seen in full during the game's first mission, which takes place on Liberty Island, and can be seen in the distance in other missions that take place in New York City.
 The 2008 video game Grand Theft Auto IV features a parody of the statue called the Statue of Happiness, which holds a coffee cup instead of a torch. The coffee cup is the tribute to the infamous Hot Coffee mod in San Andreas. Additionally, the statue's face is modelled to look like Hillary Clinton, and its otherwise hollow chest contains a massive beating heart suspended by chains. The Statue of Happiness also appears in Grand Theft Auto: Chinatown Wars, however, it is downsized in order to be more visible in the game's top-down angle. While the structure retains the star fort base, the pedestal was removed and the statue is smaller.
 In the 2011 video game Saints Row: The third a statue in the game acts as a version of the Statue of Liberty
 In the 2013 video game Saints Row 4 a statue in the game acts as a version of the Statue of Liberty
 In the 2014 video game Assassin's Creed Unity, the statue appears in a time distortion Rift Mission which features 1889 Paris as a paradox; the statue should have been shipped from France to America by that year as mentioned in the game.
 It is a playable character in Lego Marvel Super Heroes, and Lego released a minifigure of it at the same time.
 In Lego Marvel Super Heroes'''s sequel, Lego Marvel Super Heroes 2, Liberty Island is a location in Chronopolis as an island in the Lemuria area, with a Statue of Liberty that has Kang's face on it.
 It appeared in the final downloadable content for Call of Duty: Advanced Warfare as a map on multiplayer.
 The statue is a buildable landmark in Sim City 3000, Sim City 4, and SimCity DS.
 The statue is a buildable world wonder in Civilization IV, Civilization V, and Civilization VI.
 The statue is a buildable landmark in Cities: Skylines.
 The statue is threatened with destruction by a Soviet Union invasion in an alternate 1989 in World in Conflict and World in Conflict: Soviet Assault.
 The statue appears in Command & Conquer: Red Alert 2, destroyed by the Soviet Union at the beginning of the game, which takes place in an alternate history.
 On the New York level of Twisted Metal 2, players can ignite the statue's torch by firing missiles at her. Further missiles will blow off her robe, revealing her as a blonde wearing a bikini. Still more missiles will destroy her.
 In Turning Point: Fall of Liberty, the statue is destroyed by German bombers when they invade the East Coast in an alternate 1953.
 In the 1998 PC game JumpStart Music, part of the JumpStart educational game series, a version of the statue is seen in a fantasy realm called Music Land. This version of the statue is holding a violin and words on the pedestal proclaim her to be the "Statue of Lullaby".
 A small-scale replica of the statue can be obtained as a furniture item in Animal Crossing: New Leaf and Animal Crossing: New Horizons as an award for helping Gulliver.
 In the 2022 video game AI: The Somnium Files – Nirvana Initiative, an argument breaks out between Amame and Gen over the location of the Statue, being on Ellis Island or Liberty Island. The correct answer is erroneously stated to be Ellis Island, as Liberty Island does not exist. This acts as both a joke reference to the Mandela effect (mentioned in the previous game) and a hint towards the simulation hypothesis, a central focus of the game, where theoretically the reason Liberty Island does not exist is because the game’s world is a simulation.

Visual arts
 Working on the Statue of Liberty, a 1946 painting by Norman Rockwell, shows workmen cleaning the torch held aloft by the statue. Originally created for the Saturday Evening Post, the painting resides in the Oval Office of the White House.
 Liberty, by contemporary artist Mark Wagner, is a large-scale collage of 14 individual panels created from 1,121 dollar bills—a 17-by-six-foot découpage homage to the Statue of Liberty. George Washington, whose face is on the bill, is prominently featured throughout the work engaged in a variety of unexpected, humorous activities taking place from top-to-bottom of the statue. Liberty'' also addresses issues of civil liberties, economics, and American identity.

As damaged and destroyed
As a famous landmark, damage and destruction of the statue has been used to symbolize the end of mankind or the destruction of New York City. The table below lists some examples of movies which feature the statue damaged or destroyed.

There have been questions raised about how the statue would hold up for thousands of years, based on her current corrosion patterns. Studies done during various repairs in the past hundred years show that the copper "skin" of the statue herself will hold up, but her insides may not. The copper has aged and chemically changed to create a patina, which on metal is a coating of various chemical compounds such as oxides, carbonates, sulfides, or sulfates formed on the surface during exposure to atmospheric elements. It is this patina that gives the statue her sea-green coloring, due to the oxidation of the copper. It also means that the statue's deterioration by seawater and winds is greatly slowed. The only thing that still poses a threat to the patina is acid rain, which has the power to corrode the surface.

The joints holding the statue together have withstood some damage by seawater, and have been periodically replaced or repaired. The greatest damage comes in the form of a weakening to the arm holding up the torch, one of the areas of the statue that supports the most weight over a relatively small area. This arm weakness was most recently repaired in the mid-1980s. The torch that the statue holds was also replaced then, because the original torch had been irrevocably damaged by water and snow seeping in through the stained glass windows cut into the flame by Gutzon Borglum in 1916. The old torch now sits in the Statue of Liberty Museum in Fort Wood. The stone at Liberty's feet has also needed repair in the past. Fifty years after the statue was first erected, in 1937, it was discovered that water was leaking in to the pedestal that the statue stands upon. A giant copper apron (250 ft. tall) was placed over the pedestal to prevent future damage. Overall, the majority of the statue would likely survive the test of time if an apocalyptic event happened on Earth, as it does in many of the following movies.

Media chart

References

Statue of Liberty